Rhenium(IV) chloride is the inorganic compound with the formula ReCl4.  This black solid is of interest as a binary phase but otherwise is of little practical value.  A second polymorph of ReCl4 is also known.

Preparation
ReCl4 can be prepared by comproportionation of rhenium(V) chloride and rhenium(III) chloride.  It can also be produced by reduction of rhenium(V) chloride with antimony trichloride.

Tetrachloroethylene at 120 °C is also effective as a reductant:

Structure
X-ray crystallography reveals a polymeric structure.  The Re–Re bonding distance is 2.728 Å. Re centers are octahedral, being surrounded by six chloride ligands. Pairs of octahedra share faces.  The Re2Cl9 subunits are linked by bridging chloride ligands. The structural motif - corner-shared bioctahedra - is unusual in the binary metal halides.

References

Rhenium compounds
Chlorides
Metal halides